The New World leaf-nosed bats (Phyllostomidae) are found from southern North America to South America, specifically from the Southwest United States to northern Argentina. They are ecologically the most varied and diverse family within the order Chiroptera. Most species are insectivorous, but the phyllostomid bats include within their number true predatory species and frugivores (subfamily Stenodermatinae and Carolliinae). For example, the spectral bat (Vampyrum spectrum), the largest bat in the Americas, eats vertebrate prey, including small, dove-sized birds. Members of this family have evolved to use food groups such as fruit, nectar, pollen, insects, frogs, other bats, and small vertebrates, and in the case of the vampire bats, even blood.

Both the scientific and common names derive from their often large, lance-shaped noses, greatly reduced in some of the nectar- and pollen-feeders. Because these bats echolocate nasally, this "nose-leaf" is thought to serve some role in modifying and directing the echolocation call. Similar nose leaves are found in some other groups of bats, most notably the Old World leaf-nosed bats.

New World leaf-nosed bats are usually brown, grey, or black, although five species are white. Most roost in fairly small groups within caves, animal burrows, or hollow trees, although some species aggregate in colonies of several hundred individuals. They do not hibernate, although some species have been reported to aestivate.

Evolution 
The Phyllostomidae, also known as New World leaf-nosed bats, are among the most ecologically diverse mammal families, displaying more morphological variation than any other mammalian family. This variation is measured by diversity in skull morphology and diet-related characteristics: Phyllostomidae consists of species that have evolved physical modifications for insectivory, frugivory, hematophagy, nectarivory, and omnivory. The nose-leaf—a distinctive characteristic of the family—is thought to have evolved to reflect dietary and foraging behavior of different species of Phyllostomidae. With an evolutionary history tracing back to the Oligocene, fossil and phylogenetic evidence suggests the family originated about 30 million years ago. Leaf nosed bats evolved from Yangochiroptera and Miniopteridae with sister groups also evolving from this group. The Phyllostomidae consist of 55 genera and about 180 species.

Description 

New World leaf-nosed bats are bilaterally symmetrical and endothermic mammals characterized by an elaborate outgrowth of skin on their noses, called a nose-leaf, which is believed to aid in echolocation. The nose-leaf can be adorned with a vertical leaf, a concave upward leaf, or multiple accessory leaves; varying by species. Leaf-nosed bats lack a tail, have triangular-shaped ears that can have pointed or rounded tips, range in body size from 4 cm to 13.5 cm, and a wingspan up to 90 cm or more.

Biology and ecology 
Like other bats, leaf-nosed bats are nocturnal foragers that use echolocation to locate food sources, though the food sources vary between species. Many bats in the family Phyllostomidae appear to have limited reliance on echolocation, likely because frugivorous bats do not need to quickly identify flying insects like many other bats. Instead, species of leaf-nosed fruit bats appear to use scent to identify their preferred food sources.

When they are not foraging, leaf-nosed bats roost in abandoned buildings, caves, and beneath folded leaves depending on the species. Nearly every roosting option present among bats is represented within this family, including species that prefer to roost alone, as well as species that roost with thousands of other individuals every day.

Diet
The Phyllostomidae demonstrate the most diverse dietary habits of any family of bats across the globe. Because of this, general dietary patterns are categorized for each species. Leaf-nosed bats generally specialize in a particular type of diet which leads to classification in one of these groups: frugivore, nectarivore, insectivore, omnivore, or haematophagous. However, categorizations are based only on primary consumption habits, therefore observing species that occasionally consume food items outside of their particular classifications is not uncommon. Usually, when leaf-nosed bats consume outside of their primary dietary categorization, it is to ensure sufficient intake of nutrients that their primary food source may not provide. For example, nectar and ripe fruits provide sufficient amounts of carbohydrates and water, but are lacking in protein and fat. To meet basic nutritional requirements, leaf-nosed bats that primarily feed on fruit and nectar must also ensure sufficient protein and fat intake by consuming insects or leaves.

Most leaf-nosed bats are classified as insectivores and feed on a variety of small insects. Certain species with this classification capture their prey either while in flight or from foliage in trees or on the ground. Carnivorous species feed on a variety of animals ranging from frogs to other bats. The Desmodontinae fall into this general carnivorous category, but are further distinguished by feeding exclusively on blood. In contrast, some species in this family feed on exclusively plants, gaining needed nutrients from fruits and leaves.

Life cycle 
Leaf-nosed bats are gonochoric (separate sexes) that partake in sexual copulation. These bats can live for 20–30 years and females become sexually active at two years of age. Female ovulation occurs from October through September, after the female mates, the gestation period ranges from 8–9 months with an initial 3- to 5-month diapause period when the fetus growth is slowed; this diapause period is controlled by hormones. The female gives birth to a single pup, which has  open ears, open eyes, and the first set of deciduous teeth, and is fully furred at birth.

Social systems 
Among species that roost in groups, some evidence exists for a social hierarchy with higher-ranking individuals gaining access to preferred areas of the site. Solitary roosting bats, though, live alone and maintain a strict fidelity to a single roosting site. In some cases, males live alone or with harems, while females prefer to roost with other individuals and their pups. In nearly every species that has been studied, mothers and pups maintain a social bond that lasts beyond nursing. Apparently, young bats can learn food preferences from their mothers and when they are reluctant to leave the nest, mothers literally nudge the infants out of the roost.

Range 
New World leaf-nosed bats range from the United States, in southern Arizona and the West Indies to northern Argentina. The family inhabits a diverse array of environments and habitats ranging from forests to deserts.

Human impact
Species of New World leaf-nosed bats that make their homes in forested areas are greatly affected by agricultural intensification. Specifically, it has been found that increased agricultural activity by humans causes negative conservation effects on these habitats and as a result reduces abundance and diversity of leaf-nosed bats that live there. California leaf-nosed bats in particular are susceptible to human disruption. This species is known to create large roosts in closed mine shafts due to their potential to provide warmth and isolation. When humans enter the shafts or rework old mines, this disrupts the roosts of the leaf-nosed bats and has the potential to be detrimental to the population as a whole.

Classification
The 192 described species within 56 genera are:

FAMILY PHYLLOSTOMIDAE
 Genus †Notonycteris
Subfamily: Brachyphyllinae 
Genus: Brachyphylla
Cuban fruit-eating bat, B. nana
Antillean fruit-eating bat, B. cavernarum
Subfamily: Carolliinae
Genus: Carollia - short-tailed leaf-nosed bats
Benkeith's short-tailed bat, C. benkeithi
Silky short-tailed bat, C. brevicauda
Chestnut short-tailed bat, C. castanea
Colombian short-tailed bat, C. colombiana
Manu short-tailed bat, C. manu
Mono's short-tailed bat, C. monohernandezi
Seba's short-tailed bat, C. perspicillata
Sowell's short-tailed bat, C. sowelli
Gray short-tailed bat, C. subrufa
Genus: Rhinophylla
Hairy little fruit bat, R. alethina
Fischer's little fruit bat, R. fischerae
Dwarf little fruit bat, R. pumilio
Subfamily: Desmodontinae - vampire bats
Genus: Desmodus
D. archaeodaptes, †
Giant vampire bat, D. draculae†,
Cuban vampire bat, D. puntajudensis†
Common vampire bat, D. rotundus 
Stock's vampire bat, D. stocki†,
Genus: Diaemus
White-winged vampire bat, D. youngi
Genus: Diphylla
Hairy-legged vampire bat, D. ecaudata
Subfamily: Glossophaginae
 Tribe Glossophagini
Genus: Anoura - Geoffroy's long-nosed bats
Anoura aequatoris
Cadena's tailless bat, A. cadenai
Tailed tailless bat, A. caudifera
Handley's tailless bat, A. cultrata
Tube-lipped nectar bat, A. fistulata
Geoffroy's tailless bat, A. geoffroyi
Broad-toothed tailless bat, A. latidens
Luis Manuel's tailless bat, A. luismanueli
Anoura peruana
Genus: Choeroniscus
Godman's long-tailed bat, C. godmani
Greater long-tailed bat, C. periosus
Lesser long-tongued bat, C. minor
Genus: Choeronycteris
Mexican long-tongued bat (hog-nosed bat), C. mexicana
Genus: Dryadonycteris
Dryades bat, D. capixaba
Genus: Glossophaga
Commissaris's long-tongued bat, G. commissarisi
Gray long-tongued bat, G. leachii
Miller's long-tongued bat, G. longirostris
Western long-tongued bat, G. morenoi
Pallas's long-tongued bat, G. soricina
Genus: Hylonycteris
Underwood's long-tongued bat, H. underwoodi
Genus: Leptonycteris - Saussure's long-nosed bats
Southern long-nosed bat, L. curasoae
Greater long-nosed bat or Mexican long-nosed bat, L. nivalis
Lesser long-nosed bat or Mexican long-nosed bat, L. yerbabuenae
Genus: Lichonycteris
Dark long-tongued bat, L. obscura
Genus: Monophyllus
Insular single leaf bat, M. plethodon
Leach's single leaf bat, M. redmani
Genus: Musonycteris
Banana bat (Colima long-nosed bat), M. harrisoni
Genus: Scleronycteris
Ega long-tongued bat, S. ega
Subfamily: Lonchophyllinae
 Tribe Lonchophyllini
Genus: Lionycteris
Chestnut long-tongued bat, L. spurrelli
Genus: Lonchophylla
Bokermann's nectar bat, L. bokermanni
Chocoan long-tongued bat, L. chocoana
Lonchophylla concava
Dekeyser's nectar bat, L. dekeyseri
Arched nectar bat, L. fornicata
Handley's nectar bat, L. handleyi
Western nectar bat, L. hesperia
Goldman's nectar bat, L. mordax
Orcés’s long-tongued bat, L. orcesi
Lonchophylla orienticollina
Lonchophylla peracchii
Orange nectar bat, L. robusta
Genus: Platalina
Long-snouted bat, P. genovensium
Genus: Xeronycteris
Vieira's long-tongued bat, X. vieirai
 Tribe Hsunycterini
Genus: Hsunycteris
Cadena's long-tongued bat, H. cadenai
Dashe's nectar bat, H. dashe
Patton's long-tongued bat, H. pattoni
Thomas's nectar bat, H. thomasi
Subfamily: Phyllonycterinae
Genus: Erophylla - brown flower bats
Brown flower bat, E. bombifrons
Buffy flower bat, E. sezekorni
Genus: Phyllonycteris - Jamaican flower bats
Jamaican flower bat, P. aphylla
Puerto Rican flower bat, P. major
Cuban flower bat, P. poeyi
Subfamily: Phyllostominae
 Tribe Micronycterini
Genus: Glyphonycteris
Behn's bat, G. behnii
Davies's big-eared bat, G. daviesi
Tricolored big-eared bat, G. sylvestris
Genus: Lampronycteris
Yellow-throated big-eared bat, L. brachyotis
Genus: Macrotus - leaf-nosed bats
California leaf-nosed bat, M. californicus
Waterhouse's leaf-nosed bat, M. waterhousii
Genus: Micronycteris - little big-eared bats
Brosset's big-eared bat, M. brosseti
Giovanni's big-eared bat, M. giovanniae
Hairy big-eared bat, M. hirsuta
Pirlot's big-eared bat, M. homezi
Matses's big-eared bat, M. matses
Little big-eared bat, M. megalotis
Common big-eared bat, M. microtis
White-bellied big-eared bat, M. minuta
Sanborn's big-eared bat, M. sanborni
Schmidts's big-eared bat, M. schmidtorum
Genus: Neonycteris
Least big-eared bat, N. pusilla
Genus: Trinycteris
Niceforo's big-eared bat, T. nicefori
 Tribe Vampyrini
Genus: Chrotopterus
Big-eared woolly bat, C. auritus
Genus: Lophostoma
Pygmy round-eared bat, L. brasiliense
Carriker's round-eared bat, L. carrikeri
Davis's round-eared bat, L. evotis
Western round-eared bat, L. occidentalis
Schultz's round-eared bat, L. schulzi
White-throated round-eared bat, L. silvicolum
Yasuni round-eared bat, L. yasuni
Genus: Tonatia - round-eared bats
Greater round-eared bat, T. bidens
Stripe-headed round-eared bat, T. saurophila
Genus: Trachops
Fringe-lipped bat, T. cirrhosus
Genus: Vampyrum
Spectral bat, V. spectrum
 Tribe Lonchorhinini
Genus: Lonchorhina - sword-nosed bats
Tomes's sword-nosed bat, L. aurita
Fernandez's sword-nosed bat, L. fernandezi
Northern sword-nosed bat, L. inusitata
Marinkelle's sword-nosed bat, L. marinkellei
Orinoco sword-nosed bat, L. orinocensis
Genus: Macrophyllum
Long-legged bat, M. macrophyllum
Genus: Mimon - Gray's spear-nosed bats
Golden bat, M. bennettii
Cozumelan golden bat, M. cozumelae
Striped hairy-nosed bat, M. crenulatum
Koepcke's hairy-nosed bat, M. koepckeae
 Tribe Phyllostomatini
Genus: Phylloderma - Peters's spear-nosed bat
Pale-faced bat, P. stenops
Genus: Phyllostomus - spear-nosed bats
Pale spear-nosed bat, P. discolor
Lesser spear-nosed bat, P. elongatus
Greater spear-nosed bat, P. hastatus
Guianan spear-nosed bat, P. latifolius
Subfamily: Stenodermatinae
Genus: Ametrida
Little white-shouldered bat, A. centurio
Genus: Ardops
Tree bat, A. nichollsi
Genus: Ariteus
Jamaican fig-eating bat, A. flavescens
Genus: Artibeus - Neotropical fruit bats
Subgenus: Artibeus
Large fruit-eating bat, A. amplus
Fringed fruit-eating bat, A. fimbriatus
Fraternal fruit-eating bat, A. fraterculus
Hairy fruit-eating bat, A. hirsutus
Honduran fruit-eating bat, A. inopinatus
Jamaican fruit bat, A. jamaicensis
Great fruit-eating bat, A. lituratus
Dark fruit-eating bat, A. obscurus
Flat-faced fruit-eating bat, A. planirostris
Artibeus schwartzi
Subgenus: Dermanura
Andersen's fruit-eating bat, A. anderseni
Aztec fruit-eating bat, A. aztecus
Bogota fruit-eating bat, A. bogotensis
Gervais's fruit-eating bat, A. cinereus
Silver fruit-eating bat, A. glaucus
Gnome fruit-eating bat, A. gnomus
Solitary fruit-eating bat, A. incomitatus
Pygmy fruit-eating bat, A. phaeotis
Rosenberg's fruit-eating bat, A. rosenbergi
Toltec fruit-eating bat, A. toltecus
Thomas's fruit-eating bat, A. watsoni
Subgenus: Koopmania
Brown fruit-eating bat, K. concolor
Genus: Centurio
Wrinkle-faced bat, C. senex
Genus: Chiroderma - big-eyed bats or white-lined bats
Brazilian big-eyed bat, C. doriae
Guadeloupe big-eyed bat, C. improvisum
Salvin's big-eyed bat, C. salvini
Little big-eyed bat, C. trinitatum
Hairy big-eyed bat, C. villosum
Genus: Ectophylla
Honduran white bat, E. alba
Genus: Enchisthenes
Velvety fruit-eating bat, E. hartii
Genus: Mesophylla
MacConnell's bat, M. macconnelli
Genus: Phyllops - falcate-winged bats
Cuban fig-eating bat, P. falcatus
Genus: Platyrrhinus
Alberico's broad-nosed bat, P. albericoi
Platyrrhinus aquilus
Slender broad-nosed bat P. angustirostris
Eldorado broad-nosed bat, P. (Vampyrops) aurarius
Short-headed broad-nosed bat, P. (Vampyrops) brachycephalus
Choco broad-nosed bat, P. chocoensis
Thomas's broad-nosed bat, P. (Vampyrops) dorsalis
Brown-bellied broad-nosed bat P. fusciventris
Heller's broad-nosed bat, P. (Vampyrops) helleri
Platyrrhinus incarum
Buffy broad-nosed bat, P. (Vampyrops) infuscus
Ismael's broad-nosed bat, P. ismaeli
White-lined broad-nosed bat, P. (Vampyrops) lineatus
Quechua broad-nosed bat, P. masu
Matapalo broad-nosed bat, P. matapalensis
Geoffroy's rayed bat, P. nigellus
Platyrrhinus nitelinea
Recife broad-nosed bat, P. (Vampyrops) recifinus
Shadowy broad-nosed bat, P. umbratus
Greater broad-nosed bat, P. (Vampyrops) vittatus
Genus: Pygoderma
Ipanema bat, P. bilabiatum
Genus: Sphaeronycteris
Visored bat, S. toxophyllum
Genus: Stenoderma
Red fruit bat, S. rufum
Genus: Sturnira - yellow-shouldered bats or American epauleted bats
Aratathomas's yellow-shouldered bat, 'S. aratathomasi
Bidentate yellow-shouldered bat, S. bidens
Bogota yellow-shouldered bat, S. bogotensis
Hairy yellow-shouldered bat, S. erythromos
Chocó yellow-shouldered bat, S. koopmanhilli
little yellow-shouldered bat, S. lilium
Highland yellow-shouldered bat, S. ludovici
Louis's yellow-shouldered bat, S. luisi
Greater yellow-shouldered bat, S. magna
Mistratoan yellow-shouldered bat, S. mistratensis
Talamancan yellow-shouldered bat, S. mordax
Lesser yellow-shouldered bat, S. nana
Tschudi's yellow-shouldered bat, S. oporaphilum
Sturnira perla Jarrin-V & Kunz, 2011
Soriano's yellow-shouldered bat, S. sorianoi
Thomas's yellow-shouldered bat, S. thomasi
Tilda's yellow-shouldered bat, S. tildae
Genus: Uroderma - tent-building bats
Tent-making bat, U. bilobatum
Brown tent-making bat, U. magnirostrum
Genus: Vampyressa - yellow-eared bats
Vampyressa elisabethae
Melissa's yellow-eared bat, V. melissa
Southern little yellow-eared bat, V. pusilla
Vampyressa sinchi
Northern little yellow-eared bat, V. thyone
Genus: Vampyriscus
Bidentate yellow-eared bat, V. bidens
Brock's yellow-eared bat, V. brocki
Striped yellow-eared bat, V. nymphaea
Genus: Vampyrodes
Great stripe-faced bat, V. caraccioli

References

 
Taxa named by John Edward Gray